Katerina Maleeva was the defending champion but did not compete that year.

Isabel Cueto won in the final 6–0, 6–1 against Laura Golarsa.

Seeds
A champion seed is indicated in bold text while text in italics indicates the round in which that seed was eliminated.

  Isabel Cueto (champion)
  Judith Wiesner (quarterfinals)
  Barbara Paulus (semifinals)
  Sabrina Goleš (second round)
  Angeliki Kanellopoulou (quarterfinals)
  Laura Garrone (first round)
  Silke Meier (first round)
  Laura Golarsa (final)

Draw

References
 1988 Athens Trophy Draw

Athens Trophy
1988 WTA Tour